The Toledo Walleye are a professional ice hockey team based in Toledo, Ohio.  The Walleye are members of the Central Division of the Western Conference of the ECHL. The Walleye were founded in 1991 as the Toledo Storm and play their home games at the Huntington Center, which opened in 2009. Since the beginning of the 2009–10 season, the team has been affiliated with the Detroit Red Wings of the National Hockey League and the Grand Rapids Griffins of the American Hockey League with an agreement in place through the 2023–24 season.

The team is currently owned and operated by Toledo Arena Sports, Inc. The current ownership group is a subsidiary of Toledo Mud Hens Baseball Club, Inc., another ownership that owns and operates the Toledo Mud Hens.

History

Toledo Storm (1991–2007) 

The Walleye were founded in 1991 as the Toledo Storm, playing their home games at Toledo Sports Arena across the river from downtown Toledo. The Storm were the first hockey team to play in Toledo since the International Hockey League's Toledo Goaldiggers suspended operations in 1986, eventually moving to Kansas City in 1990. In the Storm's inaugural season, the team won the West Division title and the Henry Brabham Cup after posting the league's best record in the regular season. The following year the Storm won its first Jack Riley Cup, defeating the Wheeling Thunderbirds in six games. The Storm came back the following season and won its second Riley Cup, defeating the Raleigh Icecaps in five games, becoming only the second team in league history to win back-to-back league titles (the first being the Hampton Roads Admirals in 1991 and 1992). The Storm were dominant in its first few years, winning four division titles in their first five seasons and posting a winning record in thirteen of the sixteen seasons the team played. The Storm won its second Brabham Cup in 2003 and made the American Conference finals during the 2005–06 season, ultimately losing to the Gwinnett Gladiators in five games. The Storm's final game came on April 19, 2007 during the 2007 North Division semifinals losing to in-state rival, Cincinnati Cyclones by a score of 4–0 getting swept in the series 3 games to 0. In sixteen seasons in the ECHL, the Storm posted a 610-395-103 record, winning two Riley Cups, two Brabham Cups and six division titles.

Sale to Toledo Arena Sports and Two Year Suspension
In 2007, Toledo Arena Sports, Inc., an Ohio-Not-For-Profit Corporation, purchased the rights to the Toledo, Ohio Territory from the ECHL. The new ownership group was planning to build a new state-of-the-art arena in downtown Toledo to replace the aging Sports Arena. Shortly after the sale, Toledo Arena Sports announced that after the 2006–07 season, the Storm would not compete again until the arena was completed and the ECHL granted the Storm a two-year voluntary suspension from competition.

In February 2008, General Manager Joe Napoli announced that former Storm goaltender, ECHL Hall of Famer, and head coach from 2003 to 2007, Nick Vitucci would return to coach the franchise when it returned to the ice in 2009. One week after announcing Vitucci as head coach, Toledo Arena Sports Inc. renamed the Storm the "Walleye," in reference to the popular game fish that is abundant in the area.

Toledo Walleye (2009–present) 

At the ECHL Mid-Season Board of Governors meeting, the league announced that the Walleye would be members of the American Conference's North Division along with the Cincinnati Cyclones, Elmira Jackals, Johnstown Chiefs, Wheeling Nailers and Kalamazoo Wings.  During the NHL's award ceremonies in Las Vegas, Detroit Red Wings general manager Ken Holland stated that the Walleye would become Detroit's ECHL affiliate for the 2009–10 season and that the Wings would send one of their three goaltender prospects (either Jordan Pearce, Thomas McCollum or Daniel Larsson) to Toledo for the season. On August 5, 2009, the Walleye announced a second affiliation agreement, becoming the ECHL affiliate of the Chicago Blackhawks and Chicago's AHL affiliate the Rockford IceHogs.
 
The Walleye opened their inaugural season on October 16, 2009, hosting the defending Brabham Cup champion Florida Everblades in the first of a three-game series. Prior to the Walleye's home opener, head coach Nick Vitucci named defenseman Ryan Stokes as the team's captain.  Despite a strong effort, the Walleye dropped their opener to Florida 1–2 in front of a sell-out crowd of 8,000, the largest crowd to ever watch a pro hockey game in Toledo at the time.  The Walleye would return the next night and rookie goaltender Jordan Pearce would stop 35 of 37 shots faced as the Walleye scored three goals in the final period to get past the Everblades for the team's first win, 5–2. On December 31, defenseman J.C. Sawyer and forward Maxime Tanguay were selected to the American Conference All-Star team and played at the All-Star Game at the Citizens Business Bank Arena in Ontario, California on January 20. Sawyer was named the captain of the American Conference All-Stars. At the end of the regular season, defenseman J.C. Sawyer was named as a First Team selection to the All-ECHL team and won the Defenseman of the Year award, while center Maxime Tanguay was named to the All-Rookie team. The Walleye would finish the regular season in eighth place in the American Conference leading to a matchup with the American Conference regular season champions, the Charlotte Checkers.  Toledo, behind a hat trick from winger Adam Keefe, claimed a 7–2 victory over top-seeded Charlotte in game one of the series, the first playoff game win for the organization since game two of the 2006 American Conference Finals against the Gwinnett Gladiators. However, the Walleye would lose the next three games to Charlotte and were eliminated from the playoffs in four games.

Due to the COVID-19 pandemic, the Walleye voluntarily suspended operations for the 2020–21 season. Coming back from the voluntary suspension, the Walleye would go on to win the Brabham Cup in the 2021–22 season, finishing with the league's best points % with.708, the only team above .700%. They would then go on to win in comeback fashion the first series of the 2022 Kelly Cup Playoffs, 4–3. They then went on to sweep Wheeling and best Utah in 5 games after losing Game 1. The Walleye would go on to lose the Kelly Cup Finals to the Florida Everblades, who beat the Newfoundland Growlers, the team that beat Toledo in the 2018-19 Kelly Cup Finals, 4 games to 1 in the Eastern Conference semifinal

Mascots

On July 27, 2009, the Walleye introduced Spike, their costumed mascot at a Toledo Mud Hens baseball game. Spike is a yellow anthropomorphic walleye, adorned with a white Walleyes jersey, blue gloves, helmet and shoes and a gap tooth smile. Spike's nemesis is Cat Trick, a fuzzy blue cat, with a fishing vest and bright yellow boots. The two like to take cheap shots at each other during games.

Winterfest

The first ECHL outdoor hockey event was at Fifth Third Field on Saturday, December 27, 2014. The Walleye lost 2-1 to the visiting Kalamazoo Wings. On January 5, the Walleye fell to the Fort Wayne Komets 3-2 in a shootout. In addition to the Walleye games, the annual Battle of the Badges game between the Toledo Police Department and Toledo Fire Department occurred on December 31, the U.S. National Under 18 Team defeated Adrian College 6-1 in an exhibition on January 1, and Bowling Green played Robert Morris to a 2-2 draw on January 4. Anthony Wayne High School, Saint Ignatius High School, Saint John's High School, Whitmer High School, and many other youth and adult teams also participated in the Winterfest. Over 10 days, an estimated 45,000 to 50,000 people attended events at the stadium.

Season-by-season record

Note: GP = Games played, W = Wins, L = Losses, OTL = Overtime losses, SOL = shootout losses, Pts = Points, GF = Goals for, GA = Goals against, PIM = Penalties in minutes

Players and personnel

Current roster 
Updated December 10, 2022.

Team captains 

 Ryan Stokes, 2009–10
 Adam Keefe, 2010–11
 Kyle Rogers, 2011–14
 Jared Nightingale, 2014–2017
 Alden Hirschfeld, 2017–2018
 T. J. Hensick, 2019–2022

Head coaches 
 Nick Vitucci, 2009–2014
 Derek Lalonde, 2014–2016
 Dan Watson, 2014 (interim), 2016–present

Team records
Updated August 12, 2021

Single season
Goals: 36  Kyle Bonis (2014–15)
Assists: 68  Shane Berschbach (2016–17)
Points: 86  Shane Berschbach (2016–17)
Penalty minutes: 246 Bryan Moore (2018–19)

Career
Goals: 116 Shane Berschbach (2014–20)
Assists: 277  Shane Berschbach (2014–20)
Points: 393  Shane Berschbach (2014–20)
Penalty minutes: 246  Bryan Moore (2018–19)
Games Played: 376  Shane Berschbach (2014–20)

Awards and honors 

Most Valuable Player
 Josh Kestner: 2019–20

Leading Scorer
 Josh Kestner: 2019–20

All-ECHL First Team
 J.C. Sawyer: 2009–10
 Shane Berschbach: 2015–16
 Josh Kestner: 2019–20

All-ECHL Second Team
 Jason Lepine: 2010–11
 Jeff Lerg: 2014–15, 2015–16
 Shane Berschbach: 2016–17
 Jake Paterson: 2016–17
 Matt Register: 2018–19

All-ECHL Rookie Team
 Maxime Tanguay: 2009–10
 Andy Bohmbach: 2010–11
 Tyler Barnes: 2014–15
 Tylor Spink: 2016–17
 Tyson Spink: 2016–17
 Nolan Zajac: 2016–17
 Billy Christopoulos: 2019–20

CCM Defenseman of the Year
 J.C. Sawyer: 2009–10

CCM Rookie of the Year
 Tyler Barnes: 2014–15
 Tyson Spink: 2016–17

ECHL All-Star Game Selection
 J.C. Sawyer: 2010
 Maxime Tanguay: 2010
 Peter Leblanc: 2011
 Luke Glendening: 2013
 Ben Youds: 2013
 Tyler Barnes: 2015

Sportsmanship Award
 Randy Rowe: 2012–13
 Shane Berschbach: 2015–16, 2016–17

North Division Champions
 2014–15: 107 Points
 2015–16: 99 Points

Central Division Champions
 2016–17: 106 Points
 2017–18: 105 Points
 2021–22: 102 Points

Bruce Taylor Trophy
ECHL Western Conference Playoff Champion
 2018–19
 2021–22

Henry Brabham Cup
ECHL regular season champion
 2014–15: 107 Points
 2016–17: 106 Points
 2021–22: 102 Points

John Brophy Award
ECHL Coach of the Year
 Derek Lalonde: 2014–15
 Dan Watson: 2016–17

Executive of the Year
 Joe Napoli: 2012–13, 2014–15
 Neil Neukam: 2017–18, 2018–19

Reebok Athletic Trainer of the Year
 Brad Fredrick: 2014–15

Ticket Executive of the Year
 Brian Perkins: 2014–15

Outstanding Media Award
Mark Monroe, Toledo Blade (2015–16)

Team awards
 Overall Award of Excellence: 2009–10, 2011–12, 2014–15, 2015–16, 2016–17, 2017–18
Ticket Department of the Year: 2016–17
Social Media Award of Excellence: 2015–16
ECHL Best Ice Award: 2015–16, 2016–17, 2017–18, 2018–19, 2019–20

References

External links

 Toledo Walleye official website
 ECHL official website

 
2
ECHL teams
Sports teams in Toledo, Ohio
Ice hockey clubs established in 2009